Haedong Jegukgi or Records of Countries Across the Sea to the East is a fifteenth-century Korean text on relations between Joseon, Japan, and the Ryūkyū Kingdom. Compiled by government officials c. 1470–71, it was presented to King Seongjong early in 1472; though this manuscript is now lost, an expanded printed version of 1512 is still extant. This later printed version includes a chronicle of the Emperors of Japan, a gazetteer of Japan, and maps of Japan and Ryūkyū.

See also
 Joseon missions to Japan
 Joseon missions to the Ryūkyū Kingdom
 Japanese missions to Joseon
 Ryūkyūan missions to Joseon
 Sin Sukju

References

Joseon dynasty works
1470s books
Korean non-fiction books
Japan–Korea relations
Foreign relations of the Joseon dynasty
Foreign relations of the Ryukyu Kingdom
History of the foreign relations of Japan
Chinese-language literature of Korea